Laura Toivanen (born 21 July 1988) is a Finnish former biathlete. She competed in the Biathlon World Cup and represented Finland at several World Championships, including the 2018 Winter Olympics.

Biathlon results

Olympic Games
0 medals

World Championships
6 medals (1 gold, 1 silver, 4 bronze)

References

External links

1988 births
Living people
Finnish female biathletes
Olympic biathletes of Finland
Biathletes at the 2018 Winter Olympics